Minuscule 316 (in the Gregory-Aland numbering), Oε321 (Soden), is a Greek minuscule manuscript of the New Testament, on cotton paper. Palaeographically it has been assigned to the 14th century. 
The manuscript has no complex contents. It has marginalia.

Description 

The codex contains the text of the Gospel of Luke (18:18-24:53) and John 1:16-12:25 on 129 paper leaves. The text is written in one column per page, in 33 lines per page.

The biblical text is surrounded by a catena.

Text 

The Greek text of the codex is a representative of the Byzantine text-type. Aland placed it in Category V.
It was not examined by the Claremont Profile Method.

History 

The manuscript came from Constantinople. It was added to the list of New Testament manuscripts by Scholz (1794–1852). 
It was examined and described by Paulin Martin. C. R. Gregory saw the manuscript in 1885.

The manuscript is currently housed at the Bibliothèque nationale de France (Gr. 211) at Paris.

See also 

 List of New Testament minuscules
 Biblical manuscript
 Textual criticism

References

Further reading 

 

Greek New Testament minuscules
14th-century biblical manuscripts
Bibliothèque nationale de France collections